Associazione Sportiva Dilettantistica Aquanera Comollo Novi was an Italian association football club, based in Novi Ligure, Piedmont.

History

The club was founded in 2010 after the merger of A.S.D. Aquanera (founded in 2001 in Basaluzzo and also representing the nearby town of Fresonara, with a 10th final position in the 2009–10 Serie D as a last result) and Comollo Novi (founded in Novi Ligure and playing in Prima Categoria Piedmont and Aosta Valley).

The radiation
On 15 December 2011 the club was excluded by the National Disciplinary Committee from Serie D and all Italian football for irregularities at registration.

Colors and badge
The team's colors were white and blue.

References

External links
 

Football clubs in Piedmont and Aosta Valley
Novi Ligure
Association football clubs established in 2010
Association football clubs disestablished in 2011
2010 establishments in Italy
2011 disestablishments in Italy